Abu Muhammad Salih b. Abi Sharif ar-Rundi (or Abu-l-Tayyib/ Abu-l-Baqa Salih b. Sharif al-Rundi) was a poet, writer, and literary critic from al-Andalus who wrote in Arabic. His fame is based on his nuniyya entitled "" Rithaa' ul-Andalus (Elegy for al-Andalus), a poem mourning the Catholic invasion and conquest of al-Andalus.

Biography 
He was born in Sevilla in 1204 and fled that town in 1248 and lived in Ceuta until his death in 1285. ar-Rundi wrote a handbook on poetry entitled al-Wafi fi Natham al-Qawafi.

References

Sources
Maya Shatzmiller, L'historiographie Mérinide. Ibn Khaldun et ses contemporains, Leiden, 1982
Abd Allah Kanun, Abu l-Baqa al-Rundi
Zubair Mohammad Ehsanul Hoque, Elegy for lost kingdoms and ruined cities in Hispano-Arabic poetry'' article, 2007

External links 
Lament for the Fall of Seville (1267), by Abu al-Baqa al-Rundi  English translation with footnotes by James T. Monroe 
Performance of Qasida by Al-Rundi (YouTube) 
(retrieved, 23-11-2010)

13th-century Arabic poets
1204 births
1285 deaths
People from Seville
13th-century Moroccan writers
13th-century writers from al-Andalus